The 2010–11 All American Hockey League season was the third season of the All American Hockey League. Six teams participated in the regular season, and the Battle Creek Revolution were the league champions.

Regular season

Final

External links 
 Season 2010/11 on hockeydb.com

All American Hockey League (2008–2011)
AAHL